99 Aquarii (abbreviated 99 Aqr) is a star in the equatorial constellation of Aquarius. 99 Aquarii is the Flamsteed designation, although it also bears the Bayer designation b2 Aquarii. It is visible to the naked eye with an apparent visual magnitude of 4.38; according to the Bortle Dark-Sky Scale this is bright enough to be seen even from city skies under ideal viewing conditions.

This is a giant star with a stellar classification of K4 III. It is a suspected variable star that apparently ranges in magnitude between 4.35 and 4.45. At the estimated distance of Delta Ophiuchi, this yields a physical size of about 33 times the radius of the Sun. The outer atmosphere has an effective temperature of 3980 K, giving it the orange-hued glow of a cool, K-type star.

This star was a candidate member of the Ursa Major Moving Group based on the work of American astronomer Nancy Roman, but this membership is now in question.

References

External links
 Image 99 Aquarii

K-type giants
Suspected variables
Ursa Major Moving Group

Aquarius (constellation)
Aquarii, b2
BD-21 6420
Aquarii, 099
220704
115669
Bright Star Catalogue objects